The 1940 season was the Hawthorn Football Club's 16th season in the Victorian Football League and 39th overall.

Fixture

Patriotic Premiership

The VFL between Rounds 14 and 15 played a one-day lightning carnival, Known as the Patriotic Premiership, at the Melbourne Cricket Ground to raise money for the Patriotic Fund. The matches played were twenty minutes long with no time-on.

Premiership Season

Ladder

References

Hawthorn Football Club seasons